The Battle of Porto Bello may refer to:

 Capture of Porto Bello (1601), was a engagement of the Anglo-Spanish War (1585–1604)
 Assault on Porto Bello (1668), by Welsh privateer Henry Morgan
 Assault on Porto Bello (1680), by buccaneer John Coxon
 Attack on Porto Bello (1702), was a engagement of the War of the Spanish Succession
 Blockade of Porto Bello (1726–1728), was a engagement of the Anglo-Spanish War (1727–1729)
 Battle of Porto Bello (1739), was a engagement of the War of Jenkins' Ear
 Porto Bello Fiasco (1742), was a expedition of the War of Jenkins' Ear
 Bombardment of Porto Bello (1744), was an action of the War of Jenkins' Ear
 Attack on Porto Bello (1814), was a engagement of the Spanish American wars of independence
 Attack on Porto Bello (1819), was a engagement of the Spanish American wars of independence